Orzechowce  is a village in the administrative district of Gmina Żurawica, within Przemyśl County, Subcarpathian Voivodeship, in south-eastern Poland.

Notable people
 Franciszek and Magdalena Banasiewicz with children, Polish Righteous among the Nations

References

Orzechowce